Michael (or Mike) Lombardi may refer to:

Michael Lombardi (American football) (born 1959), American football executive and sports commentator
Michael Lombardi (entrepreneur) (born 1964), Canadian-born entrepreneur, investor, publisher and author
Mick Lombardi, American football coach 
Michael Lombardi (actor) (born 1976), American actor